Madagascar Institute of Political Studies is a department of the Reformed University of Madagascar (Université Reformée de Madagascar). It is based in Antananarivo, Madagascar. The university was opened in 2010. The president is Davida Rajaon.

The branches of the university are: Territorial Management and Development, Management of CSOs and Associations, Political Science, Marketing Communications and Journalism.

External links
Official website

Universities in Madagascar
Educational institutions established in 2010
2010 establishments in Madagascar